Casandra Montero Rodríguez (born 31 May 1994) is a Mexican footballer who plays as a midfielder for Liga MX Femenil team C.D. Guadalajara and the Mexico women's national football team.

Early career
Montero played for amateur football team Orizaba Real Tamuin. In 2017, she captained the team and scored 41 goals in the regional women's football tournament. She later joined the team's technical staff.

Montero also played rugby in her youth. She was a member of Tepetlan Rugby Club in Córdoba. In 2015, she represented Mexico in the Women's Sevens Series in Dublin.

Club career

C.D. Veracruz
In July 2019, Montero made her professional debut for Liga MX Femenil team C.D. Veracruz.

Mazatlán F.C.
In December 2019, Montero joined Monarcas Morelia. She stayed with the team following their relocation and rebrand as Mazatlán F.C.

C.D. Guadalajara
In June 2021, Montero signed with C.D. Guadalajara.

International career
In 2013, Montero was called up to the Mexico women's national under-20 football team.

In April 2022, Montero scored on her debut for Mexico in a 11–0 win over Anguilla.

References

External links
 

1994 births
Living people
Footballers from Veracruz
Mexican women's footballers
Women's association football midfielders
Liga MX Femenil players
C.D. Guadalajara (women) footballers
Female rugby sevens players
Mexico women's international footballers
20th-century Mexican women
21st-century Mexican women
Mexican footballers